Nataliya Shekhodanova (born 29 December 1971) is a Russian hurdler. She competed in the 100 metres hurdles at the 1996 Summer Olympics and the 2000 Summer Olympics.

She finished seventh at the 1990 World Junior Championships and seventh at the 1996 Olympic Games. However, at the Olympics she failed a doping test for steroids. She later reached the semi-final at the 2000 Olympic Games.

Her personal best time was 12.59 seconds, achieved in July 1996 in Saint Petersburg.

See also
List of doping cases in athletics

References

1971 births
Living people
Sportspeople from Krasnoyarsk
Russian female hurdlers
Olympic female hurdlers
Olympic athletes of Russia
Athletes (track and field) at the 1996 Summer Olympics
Athletes (track and field) at the 2000 Summer Olympics
World Athletics Championships athletes for Russia
Russian Athletics Championships winners
Doping cases in athletics
Russian sportspeople in doping cases